Candace Marie Chapman (born 2 April 1983) is a retired Trinidad and Tobago-born, Canadian soccer player. From Ajax, Ontario, she played as a defender and was a member of the Canadian national team. She is currently a youth team national coach.

Early life
Chapman was born in Port of Spain, Trinidad and Tobago. She is a graduate of the University of Notre Dame with majors in sociology and computer applications.

Club career
After being named as a discovery player by the Boston Breakers of WPS on 16 January 2009, she played with them for the 2009 season. She subsequently agreed to terms with FC Gold Pride for the 2010 season. Following Gold Pride's folding, she signed for Western New York Flash, where she played the 2011 season along with fellow Canadian and national team captain Christine Sinclair.For the 2013 NWSL season Chapman joined Washington Spirit in the new National Women's Soccer League. Because she holds US permanent residency, she was not subject to the league's limit on international players.

International career
On 6 August 2008, Chapman scored the first point in the first event at the 2008 Summer Olympics with her goal against Argentina in the 27th minute in Tianjin, China.

Chapman received her 100th cap against Mexico on 27 January 2012. The game ended in a 3–1 victory for Canada. She won an Olympic bronze medal at the 2012 Summer Olympics when Canada defeated France 1–0 on 9 August 2012.  she is an assistant coach for the Arlington Soccer Association.

Coaching career
Candace continues to coach throughout Maryland with the private coaching service, CoachUp. As of May 2018 she is an assistant coach for the Arlington Soccer Association.

References

External links

 
 / Canada Soccer Hall of Fame
 Washington Spirit player profile
 Western New York Flash player profile
 Notre Dame player profile
 Missouri coaching profile

1983 births
Living people
Sportspeople from Port of Spain
Naturalized citizens of Canada
Trinidad and Tobago emigrants to Canada
Women's association football defenders
Boston Breakers players
FC Gold Pride players
Black Canadian women's soccer players
Canadian women's soccer players
Canada women's international soccer players
Women's association football midfielders
Vancouver Whitecaps FC (women) players
Western New York Flash players
Footballers at the 2008 Summer Olympics
Footballers at the 2011 Pan American Games
Footballers at the 2012 Summer Olympics
Olympic bronze medalists for Canada
Olympic medalists in football
Olympic soccer players of Canada
Notre Dame Fighting Irish women's soccer players
Expatriate women's soccer players in the United States
2007 FIFA Women's World Cup players
2011 FIFA Women's World Cup players
Pan American Games gold medalists for Canada
Pan American Games bronze medalists for Canada
USL W-League (1995–2015) players
FIFA Century Club
National Women's Soccer League players
Washington Spirit players
Medalists at the 2012 Summer Olympics
Canadian expatriate sportspeople in the United States
Pan American Games medalists in football
Atlanta Silverbacks Women players
Medalists at the 2011 Pan American Games
Women's Professional Soccer players